Painted Faces is a 1929 American Pre-Code mystery film directed by Albert S. Rogell and starring Joe E. Brown, Helen Foster and Barton Hepburn. The film's sets were designed by the art director Hervey Libbert.

Synopsis
After a vaudeville performer is murdered, another member of the troupe is arrested. During his trial only one juror, himself a entertainer, holds that he has been framed and seeks out the real culprit.

Cast
 Joe E. Brown as Hermann / Beppo
 Helen Foster as Nancy 
 Barton Hepburn as Buddy Barton 
 Dorothy Gulliver as Babe Barnes 
 Lester Cole as Roderick 
 Richard Tucker as District Attorney 
 Purnell Pratt as Foreman of Jury 
 Mabel Julienne Scott as Mrs. Warren - Nervous Woman Jury Member 
 Clem Beauchamp as Jury Member 
 Joseph Belmont as Jury Member 
 Alma Bennett as Jury Member 
 Allan Cavan as Defense Attorney 
 William B. Davidson as Ringmaster 
 Russ Dudley as Jury Member 
 Dannie Mac Grant as Circus Spectator 
 Walter Jerry as Jury Member 
 Sôjin Kamiyama as Cafe Owner 
 Gertrude Kerkis as Little Girl
 Clinton Lyle as Jury Member 
 Florence Midgley as Jury Member 
 Jack Richardson as Stage Manager 
 Howard Truesdale as Jury Member 
 May Wallace as Jury Member

References

Bibliography
 Bruce Babington & Charles Barr. The Call of the Heart: John M. Stahl and Hollywood Melodrama. Indiana University Press, 2018.

External links

1929 films
1929 mystery films
American black-and-white films
American mystery films
1920s English-language films
Films directed by Albert S. Rogell
Tiffany Pictures films
1920s American films